This is a list of the United States Billboard Dance Club Songs number-one hits of 2018.

References

United States Dance Club
2018
number-one dance singles